Smolar is a surname. Notable people with the surname include:

Eugeniusz Smolar (born 1945), Polish journalist
Adi Smolar (born 1959), Slovenian singer-songwriter and composer
Aleksander Smolar (born 1940), Polish writer, political activist, and adviser
Boris Smolar (1897–1986), Russian-born Jewish-American journalist and newspaper editor

See also

Smoler
Smolarz (disambiguation)
Smolarek
Smoliar

Occupational surnames